The Hollywood & Western Building, also known as The Mayer Building, and formerly known as the "Hollywood Western Building", is a four-story Art Deco office building in Hollywood, Los Angeles, California. It was designated Los Angeles Historic-Cultural Monument #336 on January 1, 1988, and was listed on the National Register of Historic Places in 2015.

Designed by S. Charles Lee, and built by Louis B. Mayer and Irving Thalberg, the building opened on December 8, 1928. The building was the first location of Motion Picture Association of America, Central Casting, the Hays Office, and The Ben Hecht Company. Hollywood Billiards, Hollywood's oldest pool hall, was located in the lower basement of the building. Over the years its tenants have also included Toppy's (a corner coffee shop), Newman Drug Co., Rexall, Bargain Saver, Hollywood Rehearsal Studios, Studio 9, Rock City Arcade, and Cosmopolitan Book Depository.

By the 1970s, the building was being used to produce pornography and was slowly converted into individual recording studios and music rehearsal spaces as the area where the building was located became increasingly seedy and dangerous. The building was used in the films Double Indemnity, Ruthless People, and Hollywood Shuffle, and was a regular shooting location for numerous TV productions. It was also used as a rehearsal studio for such bands as Guns N' Roses and White Zombie.

The building was heavily damaged in the 1994 Northridge earthquake and was vacant for several years. It has since been renovated, and its tenants as of 2013 included the local offices of U.S. Representative Adam Schiff and Los Angeles City Councilman Mitch O'Farrell.

On July 6, 2021, ABS Properties, Inc. announced plans to convert the building into 79 income-restricted apartments.

References

External links

 S. Charles Lee biography
 University of California file photo
 University of California file photo
 University of California file photo
 University of California file photo
 Footage from 1994 on YouTube
 Los Angeles Times article from October 9, 1994 
 United States Department of the Interior National Register of Historic Places 
 Hollywood & Western to become affordable housing

Culture of Hollywood, Los Angeles
Los Angeles Historic-Cultural Monuments
Office buildings in Los Angeles
Art Deco architecture in California
Office buildings completed in 1928
Buildings and structures in Hollywood, Los Angeles
Hollywood Boulevard
National Register of Historic Places in Los Angeles
1928 establishments in California
Adaptive reuse of industrial structures in Greater Los Angeles